Anton Chekhov (1860–1904) was a Russian physician, dramatist and writer.

Chekhov/Chekov (masculine) or Chekhova (feminine) may also refer to:

Places
Chekhov Urban Settlement, a municipal formation which the Town of Chekhov in Chekhovsky District of Moscow Oblast, Russia is incorporated as
Chekhov (inhabited locality), several inhabited localities in Russia
Chekov (crater), a crater on Mercury

Other uses
Chekhov (surname) (Chekhova, Chekov), including fictional characters
2369 Chekhov, an asteroid
Chekhov Gymnasium, school, and now museum in Taganrog
Chekhov Library, public library in Taganrog
Anton Chekhov-class motorship

See also
Pavel Chekov, a character from the television series Star Trek
Commodity checkoff program, an organization that collects funds from producers of a particular agricultural commodity
Chekhovo
Chekhovsky (disambiguation)